Anna Anatolyevna Krylova (née Kuropatkina) (born 3 October 1985) is a Russian triple jumper.

Achievements

External links 

1985 births
Living people
Russian female triple jumpers
Sportspeople from Rostov Oblast
World Athletics Championships athletes for Russia